Lucifer Morningstar is a DC Comics character, an adaptation of Lucifer—the Biblical fallen angel and devil of Christianity.

Lucifer Morningstar may also refer to:

DC Comics
 Lucifer Morningstar (Constantine), a character in the films Constantine (2000) and the forthcoming Constantine 2 (2024)
 Lucifer Morningstar (Lucifer), a character in the TV series Lucifer (2016–2021) and The Flash (2019)
 Lucifer Morningstar (The Sandman), a character in the TV series The Sandman (2022–present).

Other media
 Lucifer Morningstar (Adventures of God), a main character in the webtoon Adventures of God (2016–present)
 Lucifer Morningstar (Chilling Adventures of Sabrina), a character in the TV series Chilling Adventures of Sabrina (2018–2020)
 Lucifer Morningstar (Rick and Morty), a character in the graphic novel Rick and Morty – Go to Hell (2020)
 Lucifer Morningstar (Hazbin Hotel), a supporting character in the animated series Hazbin Hotel (2023–present)